Milorad "Milo" Čavić (born May 31, 1984) is a Serbian former professional swimmer. He won a silver medal in the 100-meter butterfly at the 2008 Summer Olympics in a historic race with American swimmer Michael Phelps. Čavić also was World and European champion, as well as world record holder. He is one of four swimmers who broke 50 seconds  in the 100m butterfly.

Swimming career
Born in Anaheim, California and a citizen of both Serbia and the United States, he attended Tustin High School in California, where he set four CIF records and a national high school mark in the 50 yd freestyle. While swimming for the University of California, Berkeley and training with Mike Bottom, Čavić set a new school and Pac-10 record in the 100 yd butterfly (45.44 s).

Representing Serbia and Montenegro at the European Short Course Swimming Championships in Dublin 2003, Čavić won the gold medal in 100 m butterfly and set a new world record in the short course. He also won a silver medal in 50 m freestyle. Čavić defended his European 100 m title on subsequent short-course championships in Helsinki 2006 (finishing 50.63), Debrecen 2007 (finishing at 50.53) and Rijeka 2008 (finishing at 49.19 and setting a new European record). He also took silver on 50 m butterfly in Rijeka.

On December 14, 2007 Čavić defended his European championship in the 100 m butterfly in Helsinki, finishing at 50.63 seconds. On December 14, 2007, the sprinter defended his European championship again in the 100 m butterfly in Debrecen, finishing at 50.53 seconds.

In 2008, Čavić won the European championship in the 50 m butterfly, setting the new European record (23.11) in Eindhoven, Holland – a result briefly quashed when the European Swimming Federation (LEN) immediately disqualified the swimmer for wearing a T-shirt at the medals ceremony that read "Kosovo is Serbia". However, his disqualification was removed and his record was recognized.

At the end of the year, he was declared the best Serbian athlete.

At the 2009 World Aquatics Championships, Čavić won gold in the 50 m butterfly  and broke the 100 m butterfly world record in the semifinals finishing in 50.01 seconds. In the finals Čavić won silver with time of 49.95. In that final, Both Cavic and winner Phelps became the first two swimmers to swim the 100 fly under 50 seconds.

He missed competitions in 2010 due to spinal surgery.

The Olympic Committee of Serbia proclaimed him sportsman of the year three times, 2003, 2008 and 2009.

In 2012 (May 26, 2012), he won the gold medal at the 2012 European Aquatics Championships in Debrecen, Hungary, in the 100 meters butterfly, setting the best time in the world in 2012 and a new championship record – 51.45 seconds.

Olympic career

2000 Sydney Summer Olympics

At the age of 16, Čavić represented Yugoslavia at the 2000 Summer Olympics in Sydney, Australia in the 100 m butterfly (disqualified) and 100 backstroke – 42nd – 58.25 s.

2004 Athens Summer Olympics

Čavić represented Serbia and Montenegro at the 2004 Summer Olympics in Athens, Greece in the 100 m butterfly, 50 m freestyle and the 100 m freestyle.

Čavić was leading in a semifinal of the 100 metre butterfly, but right after the turn at the halfway point of the race, his suit opened at the neck and sucked in water, causing Čavić to finish last. In the heats of the 100 metre freestyle, Čavić finished 19th missing the semi-finals by 0.02 seconds.

Čavić trained at The Race Club, a swimming club founded by Olympic swimmers Gary Hall, Jr. and his father, Gary Hall, Sr. The Race Club, originally known as "The World Team," was designed to serve as a training group for elite swimmers across the world in preparation for the 2000 Sydney Olympics. To be able to train with the Race Club, one must either have been ranked in the top 20 in the world the past 3 calendar years or top 3 in their nation in the past year. The Race Club included such well known swimmers as Roland Mark Schoeman, Mark Foster, Ryk Neethling, Ricky Busquet and Therese Alshammar. The Race Club offers various swimming camps, swim clinics, and swimming technique video recording year round for young swimmers at their Islamorada, Florida based training center.

2008 Beijing Summer Olympics

Čavić represented Serbia at the 2008 Summer Olympics in Beijing, People's Republic of China in two swimming events.  Even though he qualified for the 100 metre freestyle semi-final Čavić withdrew in order to prepare for the 100 metre butterfly.

On August 14, 2008 at the Beijing Olympics, Čavić broke the 100 meter butterfly Olympic Record during the preliminary heats, finishing ahead of Michael Phelps and also recorded the fastest time in the semi-finals. Čavić came in second to Phelps by one hundredth of a second in the final, and became Serbia's inaugural Olympiad medalist. It was Phelps' seventh gold medal of the Olympiad. The Serbian team initially challenged the result but FINA later confirmed the finish. It was later confirmed by the FINA and Omega timekeeping officials that Čavić indeed arrived first but it was Phelps who, in the milliseconds after touching the wall, applied more force to trigger an electronic touchpad first. Čavić later wrote in his blog: "People, this is the greatest moment of my life. If you ask me, it should be accepted and we should move on. I’ve accepted defeat, and there’s nothing wrong with losing to the greatest swimmer there has ever been".

Čavić continued training at The Race Club.

2012 London Summer Olympics

Čavić represented Serbia at the 2012 Summer Olympics in London, England, making it his sporting finale. He qualified for the 100 meter butterfly final and tied for fourth place.

Honours and awards
 OCS Sportsman of the Year Award (3): 2003, 2008, 2009
 Golden Badge of DSL Sport (1): 2008

See also
 List of swimmers
 List of Olympic medalists in swimming (men)
 List of World Aquatics Championships medalists in swimming (men)
 List of European Aquatics Championships medalists in swimming (men)
 List of European Short Course Swimming Championships medalists (men)
 List of European records in swimming
 List of European Championships records in swimming
 List of Serbian records in swimming
 The Race Club

References

External links 

 
 
 
 
  (archive)
 
 Arluck Promotions (Milorad Cavic's marketing agent)
 Biography by The Orange County Register

1984 births
Living people
Serbian male swimmers
California Golden Bears men's swimmers
American people of Serbian descent
Olympic swimmers of Yugoslavia
Olympic swimmers of Serbia and Montenegro
Olympic swimmers of Serbia
Swimmers at the 2000 Summer Olympics
Swimmers at the 2004 Summer Olympics
Swimmers at the 2008 Summer Olympics
Swimmers at the 2012 Summer Olympics
Olympic silver medalists for Serbia
Male butterfly swimmers
Serbian male freestyle swimmers
Sportspeople from Anaheim, California
World record setters in swimming
World Aquatics Championships medalists in swimming
European Aquatics Championships medalists in swimming
Medalists at the 2008 Summer Olympics
European champions for Serbia
Yugoslav male swimmers
Olympic silver medalists in swimming
Yugoslav male freestyle swimmers